Lieutenant-General Sarfraz Sattar (Urdu: سرفراز ستار) HI(M) and Imtiazi  Sanad is retired three star Pakistani army general who had the post of Director General Strategic Plans Division (Strategic Plans Division Force). He also commanded II Corps, Multan. Before that he was General Officer Commanding (GOC) of 8th Infantry Division, Sialkot. He belongs to the armoured corps and 70th Pakistan Military Academy Long Course. He was promoted to Lieutenant General on 30 September 2016. COAS Qamar Bajwa installed Lt General Sarfraz Sattar as Colonel Commandant Armoured Corps on 15 November 2019.

 Sattar also served as the Director General of Military Intelligence and military attaché to India.

During General Raheel Sharif’s stint as the COAS, the most junior lieutenant general was Sarfraz Sattar. It would not be out of place to mention here that General (retd) Raheel Sharif, before his retirement, suggested his name as one of the options for the military command in 2019 for continuation of his policies.

References

Pakistani military officers